Denis Kadrić (born 12 June 1995) is a Bosnian chess player who holds the FIDE title of Grandmaster.

Chess career
Kadrić family moved to Germany in 1992. He was born in 1995, and his family returned to Bosnia in 1998. When Denis was five years old, his father taught him the rules of the game.

He won the Bosnia and Herzegovina Chess Championship in 2013 in Cazin. He has represented Bosnia in four Chess Olympiads; 2012 (6.5/9 on board five), 2014 (7/11 on board four), 2016 (8.5/11 on board 2) and 2018 (7/11 on board one).

In 2011 he was awarded the title of International Master (IM) and in 2015 the title of Grandmaster (GM). As of June 2021, he is  the number one ranked player in Bosnia.

He has qualified for the Chess World Cup 2021.

References

External links

1995 births
Living people
Bosnia and Herzegovina chess players
Chess grandmasters